The MV Heng Tong 77 was a Panama-registered cargo ship which became stranded near Karachi in July 2021.

Description 
The ship was owned by a Hong Kong-based shipping company and flagged in Panama.

Capsizing incident 

On 21 July 2021, the ship lost anchor and started drifting towards shallow waters near Karachi. The ship was reportedly there for the purpose of a crew change. The ship is now detained by the Government of Pakistan due to defective conditions of the hull.

The Ministry of Maritime Affairs declared Heng Tong 77 as "unseaworthy" and detained the ship. 
On 29 July 2021, the defueling of the ship was completed, resulting in removal of 118 tonnes of bunker fuel.

On 23 August 2021, the ship became stuck again at a new part of the Seaview beach after floating  at Karachi's Seaview. Final floating was made on 7 September 2021, by the effort of the Pakistan Navy. Rescue operation was conducted jointly by teams of Pakistan Maritime Security Agency, Pakistan Navy and Karachi Port Trust.

References

2002 ships
Merchant ships of Panama
2021 in the United States
Maritime incidents in 2021
Maritime incidents in Pakistan
2021 in Pakistan
Ship grounding
Clifton, Karachi
Shipwrecks in the Arabian Sea
July 2021 events in Pakistan